The Maison Morisset (also known by its nickname "La Brimbale") is a farmhouse built in 1678 during the seigneurial system of New France. Located in the municipality of Sainte-Famille on Île d'Orléans, the Maison Morisset was classified as a historic site and building by the Ministry of Culture and Communications of Quebec on June 7, 1962. It is reputed to be the oldest stone house in the province of Quebec.

In addition to its historical and architectural interest, the house has appeared in a large number of books and works of art, including several appearances on television. One of the first of these was the cover of La Fille Laide by Yves Thériault.

Gallery

References

External links 

  Association des familles Morissette du Canada
  Maison Morisset - Canadian Register of Historic Places

Heritage buildings of Quebec
Houses in Quebec